The 26th Division,, also known as the Northern Division was the Somali Army division responsible for northern Somalia. It was headquartered in Hargeisa, Somalia. It consisted of 10 units. At one point it was one of five army divisions in Somalia.

Muse Hassan Sheikh Sayid Abdulle has been referred to as commander of the 26th Division in 1970–71.

In 1977, the division was responsible for the Dire Dawa front in the Ogaden War.

Maxamed Xaashi “Gaani,” related to Barre’s second wife, was placed in charge of the twenty-sixth military region in 1980, and was in the area when the regime began large-scale repression against the Isaaq in 1981. in 1987 "Gaani" was appointed vice-minister of defence (or deputy minister).

From 1986 to 1988, General Mohamed Said Hersi Morgan was the commander of the 26th Sector (the region of Somaliland) before being appointed Minister of Defense in September 1990. Divisions in the 26th Sector by this time included Division 1, Division 2 at Hargeisa, 3, and 11.

Units
26th Division
14th Armoured Brigade 
?? Armoured Brigade 
17th Motorised Brigade 
?? Motorised Brigade 
15th Infantry Brigade 
18th Infantry Brigade 
23rd Infantry Brigade 
?? Artillery Brigade 
?? Tank Brigade

References

http://somalitalk.com/2009/jun/20ma409.html head of finance in Division 26, 1970-75.

Military of Somalia
Divisions (military units)